Apianus is a lunar impact crater that is located on the rugged south-central highlands of the Moon. It is named after 16th century German mathematician and astronomer Petrus Apianus. It is located to the northeast of the crater Aliacensis, and to the northwest of Poisson. The worn crater Krusenstern is attached to the west-northwestern rim.

Description 

The outer wall of the crater has been worn and eroded by subsequent impacts, and a pair of small craterlets overlay the rim to the southeast and northeast. The central crater is 63 kilometers in diameter and 2,080 meters deep. The craterlet on the southeast rim, Apianus B, is a member of a cluster of co-joined craterlets that includes Apianus T and Apianus U. The interior floor of the central crater is relatively smooth and lacks a central peak, although the surface appears somewhat convex. Only a few tiny craterlets mark the surface.

The crater is from the Nectarian period, 3.92 to 3.85 billion years ago.

Satellite craters 

By convention these features are identified on lunar maps by placing the letter on the side of the crater midpoint that is closest to Apianus.

See also 
 19139 Apian, asteroid

References

External links 

 Crater Apianus in the Gazetteer of Planetary Nomenclature of the Astrogeology Research Program of the United States Geological Survey
 Crater Apianus: Lunar Map LAC-95 of the Aeronautical Chart and Information Center of the United States Air Force in the Lunar Map Catalog of the Lunar and Planetary Institute
 Crater Apianus: Available Lunar Maps according to the Astrogeology Research Program of the United States Geological Survey
 Crater Apianus in the Digital Lunar Orbiter Photographic Atlas of the Moon of the Lunar and Planetary Institute - Image IV-095-H3
 Crater Apianus in the Digital Lunar Orbiter Photographic Atlas of the Moon of the Lunar and Planetary Institute - Image IV-096-H1
 Crater Apianus in the Digital Lunar Orbiter Photographic Atlas of the Moon of the Lunar and Planetary Institute - Image IV-096-M
 Crater Apianus in the Digital Lunar Orbiter Photographic Atlas of the Moon of the Lunar and Planetary Institute - Image IV-100-H3
 Crater Apianus in the Digital Lunar Orbiter Photographic Atlas of the Moon of the Lunar and Planetary Institute - Image IV-101-H1

Impact craters on the Moon
Nectarian